A list of notable films produced in Greece in the 1940s.

1940s

External links
 Greek film at the IMDb

1940s
Greek
Films